The Glens Falls Feeder Canal is a canal from Glens Falls, New York, United States through Hudson Falls and into Fort Edward. The Feeder Canal Heritage Trail runs along a large part of the canal.

History
When a flood destroyed part of the dam across the Hudson River at Fort Edward, the feeder canal failed to provide enough water.

In 1824 a new dam was built across the Hudson River upstream of Glens Falls and digging of the Glens Falls Feeder Canal began. It ran  eastward to join the Champlain Canal, guaranteeing adequate water at its highest elevation.

In 1832, the Feeder Canal was widened and deepened to accommodate boat traffic as well. Thirteen masonry locks were constructed to overcome the  vertical drop east of Sandy Hill (now called Hudson Falls). This engineering feat includes the "Five Combines" Locks in Hudson Falls (at the intersection of Pine Street and Burgoyne Avenue. The Combine Locks lower water 55 vertical feet. The present-day Champlain Barge Canal eliminated the need for boat traffic on the Feeder Canal in the early 1900s.

Present day
Today the canal is still an important source of water for the Champlain Canal as well as the Finch Pruyn & Company Paper Mill, which lies just east of the start of the Canal in Glens Falls. It is maintained by the New York State Canal Corporation.

The canal is a popular destination for canoeing and kayaking. The canal was added to the National Register of Historic Places in 1985. The not-for-profit Feeder Canal Alliance was formed in 1987 to preserve, promote and maintain the Feeder Canal.

References

External links

Canals in New York (state)
Canals on the National Register of Historic Places in New York (state)
Historic American Engineering Record in New York (state)
Tourist attractions in Washington County, New York
Tourist attractions in Warren County, New York
Transportation buildings and structures in Washington County, New York
Transportation buildings and structures in Warren County, New York
Canals opened in 1822
National Register of Historic Places in Warren County, New York
1822 establishments in New York (state)